Revolt of the Mercenaries (Italian: La rivolta dei mercenari) is a 1961 Italian-Spanish historical adventure film directed by Piero Costa and starring Virginia Mayo, Conrado San Martín and Susana Canales.

The film's sets were designed by the art directors Saverio D'Eugenio and Augusto Lega.

Cast
 Virginia Mayo as Lady Patrizia, Duchessa di Rivalta 
 Conrado San Martín as Capitano Lucio Di Rialto 
 Susana Canales as Katia 
 Livio Lorenzon as Conte Keller Paroli 
 Carla Calò as Miriam du Marchant 
 Franco Fantasia as Ilario 
 Alfredo Mayo as Marco 
 John Kitzmiller as Tago 
 Tomás Blanco as Capitano Brann 
 Anita Todesco as Prisca 
 Pilar Cansino as Simonetta 
 Marco Tulli as Stefano - Principe di Siena 
 Luciano Benetti as One of Lucio's Men 
 Enzo Fiermonte as Cizzania 
 Amedeo Trilli as Pintar, Katia's Father 
 Marilù Sangiorgi as Gypsy Girl 
 Xan das Bolas as Katia's Companion 
 Ángel del Pozo as Arrigo 
 Diana Lorys as Nora 
 Franco Pesce as Old Man
 Alberto Cevenini as Alessandro

References

Bibliography 
 Roy Kinnard & Tony Crnkovich. Italian Sword and Sandal Films, 1908–1990. McFarland, 2017.

External links 
 

1961 films
Italian historical adventure films
Spanish historical adventure films
1960s historical adventure films
1960s Italian-language films
Films directed by Piero Costa
Films with screenplays by Luciano Vincenzoni
1960s Italian films
Italian-language Spanish films